The Suspicion is the 24th book in the Animorphs series, written by K.A. Applegate. It is narrated by Cassie.

Plot summary
While Rachel tries to convince Cassie to go to the beach with her, Cassie notices what looks like a toy spaceship attached to her water pump. Cassie notes that it's where she hid the blue box, and is a bit unsettled by it, but brushes it off and puts the spaceship with a bunch of other things being donated to charity. They head off to the beach, coming back to find Jake. They notice a different "toy" spaceship attached to the water pump and, while they watch, it detaches itself and flies away. The Animorphs immediately hold a meeting and decide to go to Goodwill to try to retrieve the spaceship that Cassie had seen earlier. While there, the spaceship starts shooting at them and demands that they surrender and bring them the "power source". It flies away and they realize it is returning to the Wildlife Rehabilitation Clinic to retrieve the blue box. Since it is a spaceship, it can travel much faster than their bird morphs, and when they finally arrive, they discover to their dismay that the waterpump was cut open and the spaceship has stolen the blue box. There are some flashes and Tobias, Cassie, and Marco are significantly smaller (about one sixteenth of an inch). Cassie and Marco decide to pretend to surrender to the Helmacrons which are the aliens that are aboard the spaceships, while Tobias stays with Rachel. It is revealed that the Helmacron females are in charge, while the males are feeble and weak. Cassie and Marco claim that they work for the Yeerks (whom the Helmacrons are familiar with and despise), and that Visser Three can get them the box. Eventually they catch up with the Visser, who is at a Sharing meeting (along with Chapman and other controllers). They morph to flies to escape the ship, now being as small as cells. The Controllers get a lucky shot, and destroy the ship, Cassie and Marco barely getting out in time. They find that they have landed on Chapman's head. The other Helmacron spaceship had lured the rest of the Animorphs there in an attempt to steal the blue box. During the meeting, the Helmacrons attack, indiscriminately shrinking everyone at the meeting. Upon seeing the blue box, along with Visser Three's prodding, all the controllers try to grab it and there is chaos. Cassie morphs into a whale in order to crash the ship. She and the other Animorphs eventually end up on Ax, the only Animorph remaining unshrunken. Visser Three and many Controllers also end up on Ax. Visser Three briefly sides with the Animorphs, saying, "I don't know about you Andalites, but these Helmacrons are really, really, really annoying me." Ax, in harrier morph, flies over to the Gardens where they all acquire and morph anteaters, which unshrinks them while in morph. As anteaters, Jake and Rachel slurp up the Helmacrons, and The Animorphs, Controllers and Helmacrons reach an agreement and everyone is unshrunken. Before the book ends, Marco and Cassie give the Helmacron males a bit of a pep talk, and it ends with the male and female Helmacrons squabbling with each other.

New Morphs

Animorphs books
1998 novels
Fiction about size change
1998 science fiction novels